Villar del Pedroso is a municipality located in the province of Cáceres, Extremadura, Spain. According to the 2014 census, the municipality has a population of 639 inhabitants.

Villages
Navatrasierra, located in the Sierra de Altamira, with 198 inhabitants.

References

External links

Municipalities in the Province of Cáceres